Triuncina cervina is a moth in the family Bombycidae described by Francis Walker in 1865. It is found in northern India and Nepal.

The wingspan is 27–31 mm. The ground colour is leathery yellow with brown or grey markings. The hindwings are yellow brown with brown lines.

References

Bombycidae
Moths described in 1958